Massoud Fouladi, also known as Massoud Keyvan-Fouladi, is an Iranian-born English ophthalmologist consultant and Medical Director of Circle.

He became a friend of Ali Parsa at University College London around 1986, also of Iranian origin. He graduated from University of Bristol in 1990 and completed his ophthalmology training at Birmingham and Midland Eye Centre in 1999. He was also awarded a Masters in Health Services Management by Birmingham Health Services Management Centre in 1998. He practices as an ophthalmologist at East Kent Hospitals University NHS Foundation Trust and was Chairman of the Association of Ophthalmologists UK from 2003 to 2007.

He and Dr Abdel-Rahman Clinical Chairman, Hinchingbrooke Health Care NHS Trust gave a presentation at the Nuffield Trust's Health Policy Summit 2013 on how quality has been improved whilst maintaining value for money at Hinchingbrooke Hospital.  He claims that Circle has found a way to squeeze additional value from the healthcare system where clinicians set their own performance targets and are responsible for deciding how to meet them.

References

Alumni of the University of Bristol
British ophthalmologists
Iranian emigrants to England